Gamburtsev may refer to:
Grigory Gamburtsev, Soviet seismologist
Gamburtsev Mountain Range, a mountain range in Eastern Antarctica, named for the seismologist